The 1997–98 Botola is the 42nd season of the Moroccan Premier League. Raja Casablanca are the holders of the title.

References

Morocco 1997–98

Botola seasons
Morocco
Botola